An election to Llanelli Borough Council was held in May 1979. It was preceded by the 1976 election and followed by the 1983 election. On the same day there was a UK General Election and were elections to the other local authorities and community councils in Wales. The leader of the council was again Michael Willis Gimblett, who had held the seat from the previous election.

Results

Llanelli Borough Ward One (three seats)

Llanelli Borough Ward Two (three seats)

Llanelli Borough Ward Three (three seats)

Llanelli Borough Ward Four (three seats)

Llanelli Borough Ward Five (three seats)

Llanelli Borough Ward Six (three seats)

Llanelli Borough Ward Seven (three seats)

Llanelli Borough Ward Eight (three seats)
Bowen had been elected as a Labour candidate in 1973 and 1976.

Llanelli Borough Ward Nine (three seats)

Llanelli Borough Ward Ten (three seats)

Llanelli Borough Ward Eleven (three seats)

References

1979
1979 Welsh local elections